The Tour des Canadiens is a condominium skyscraper complex in Montreal, Quebec, Canada. It is situated next to the Bell Centre in downtown Montreal, at Avenue des Canadiens-de-Montréal and Rue de la Montagne, and is named for the Montreal Canadiens hockey team, which is a part-owner of the project.

The first tower consists of 552 condos, with thirteen floors of parking and a large sports bar on the ground floor.

Two subsequent towers were added to the Tour des Canadiens project, with the Tour des Canadiens 2 completed in 2019 and construction on the Tour des Canadiens 3 wrapping up in 2021.

Construction on Tour des Canadiens 1 began in July 2013, and was completed in 2016. As of February 2013, the project had been approved by the city and was 100% sold.

At 50 floors and an estimated , it is the seventh tallest building in the city, and the second  tallest residential tower.

References

External links
Official website - La Tour des Canadiens

Skyscrapers in Montreal
Downtown Montreal
Residential condominiums in Canada
Buildings and structures completed in 2016
Residential skyscrapers in Canada
Montreal Canadiens
2016 establishments in Quebec